Sangerhausen was a district (Kreis) in the south of Saxony-Anhalt, Germany. Neighboring districts were (from north clockwise) Quedlinburg, Mansfelder Land, Merseburg-Querfurt, and the districts Kyffhäuserkreis and Nordhausen in Thuringia. Sangerhausen was merged on July 1, 2007, with Mansfelder Land into the new district Mansfeld-Südharz as part of a reform.

History 
The district was created on October 1, 1816, after Sachsen-Weißenfels became part of Prussia in 1815. In 1945 the Amt Allstedt was added to the district, in 1952 some municipalities were removed from the district, which decreased the area from 773 to 689 km2. In the communal reform of 1994 the district remained unchanged.

Geography 

The highest elevation of the district is the Großer Auerberg near Stolberg with 579 m above sea level, the lowest elevation with 119.8 m is near Curtsgehofenmühle southwest of Allstedt.

Coat of arms

Towns and municipalities